Globeville is a neighborhood of Denver, Colorado. Globeville is located in the area traditionally called North Denver.

Boundaries
According to a document titled, "Globeville Neighborhood Assessment," prepared by the Denver Department of Planning and Community Development in 2008, "Globeville is located in north Denver and is bounded by the South Platte River on the east and south, Inca Street on the west, and the City limits (mostly 52nd Avenue) on the north. The neighborhood is identified by the 2000 U.S. Census as Census Tract 15. Interstates 25 and 70 bisect the neighborhood vertically and horizontally, respectively."

History

According to the 2008 neighborhood assessment, 

The average price per square foot of a home in Globeville in May, 2017 was $420.15.

Demographics

The racial makeup of Globeville is 10.57% white (4.98% white alone-non Hispanic), 2.11% African American, 0.50% Asian, 0.44% Native American. Hispanic or Latino of any race is 91.95% of the population.

The Globeville neighborhood poverty rate is 23.15% of the population, well above the Denver and national averages. Globeville has one of the highest crime rates in all of Denver, with a rate of 288 incidents per 1,000 people.

Landmarks
Globeville contains several landmarks and structures that are well known in the Denver area. One of these is the Mousetrap, which is the large freeway interchange where Interstate 25 intersects with Interstate 70 in the neighborhood. Another is Saint Joseph's Polish Roman Catholic Church, located at 517 East 46th Avenue, in the neighborhood. Also, the South Platte River serves as the neighborhood's eastern boundary. A park called Globeville Landing Park is on the east side of the river, technically outside the neighborhood. The Colorado Front Range Trail runs through Globeville along the west bank of the South Platte River and is used here mainly as a bike path. Another significant landmark in Globeville, and a favorite of the children, is Argo park.  It is located in the heart of Globeville.

References

External links
Globeville Neighborhood Assessment
Saint Joseph's Polish Church
Streetsblog DENVER posts about Globeville (2015-2019 posts; no new content)

Former municipalities in Colorado
Neighborhoods in Denver